The Men's 100m T12 had its first round held on September 8, beginning at 10:35. The Semifinals were held on September 9, at 10:25 and the A and B Finals were held on September 10 at 17:35.

Medalists

Results

References
Round 1 - Heat 1
Round 1 - Heat 2
Round 1 - Heat 3
Round 1 - Heat 4
Round 1 - Heat 5
Round 1 - Heat 6
Round 1 - Heat 7
Semifinals - Heat 1
Semifinals - Heat 2
Semifinals - Heat 3
Final A
Final B

Athletics at the 2008 Summer Paralympics